Figure skating at the 1986 Asian Winter Games took place in the city of Sapporo, Japan with four events contested. The competition took place at the Mikaho Gymnasium.

Japan finished first in medal table by winning two gold medals.

Medalists

Medal table

References
 Results of the First Winter Asian Games

External links
 OCA official website

 
1986 Asian Winter Games events
1986 in figure skating
1986
Asian Games